The 2000–01 season was Port Vale's 89th season of football in the English Football League, and first season back (thirty-eighth overall) in the Second Division. A season of two halves, Vale were struggling at the bottom of the table when Isthmian League minnows Canvey Island knocked the Vale out of the FA Cup with a 2–1 victory at Vale Park in 'one of the great shocks in FA Cup history'. They also exited the League Cup at the First Round. Things turned round in the second half of the season, as a twelve-game unbeaten run in the league was complemented with a League Trophy Final win over Brentford – the second time the club lifted the trophy. In the background of this was a financial crisis at the club, which motivated fan protests against Chairman Bill Bell.

Overview

Second Division
The pre-season saw Brian Horton sign Irish goalkeeper Dean Delany (Everton); midfielder Marc Bridge-Wilkinson (Derby County); and Michael Twiss (Manchester United) – all on free transfers. He also brought in David Freeman on a loan deal from Nottingham Forest, as well as David Beresford from Huddersfield Town. Horton also signed South African striker Sinclair Le Geyt on a one-month contract, though he would not make a first team appearance. On the eve of the season, top scorer Tony Rougier was sold to Reading for £325,000.

The season opened with a disappointing 4–1 defeat at Boundary Park to Oldham Athletic, though the Vale then recovered to record two 3–0 victories. Two points from the next seven games follow, turning hopes of promotion into fears of relegation, and putting pressure onto Horton. During this run the Vale renewed hostilities with rivals Stoke City, recording a 1–1 draw at Burslem on 17 September. Their form stabilized with a four-game unbeaten run throughout November, but then no points were gained from any of the four December games. Horton attempted to sign Isaiah Rankin on loan from Bradford City, but Bill Bell rejected the move as he felt the wage bill was already too high. In January, young striker Steve Brooker was signed from Watford for a £15,000 fee. Jamaican international striker Onandi Lowe also arrived on a short-team deal, and Wayne Gray joined on loan from Wimbledon. Vale then found their feet in February, and managed to avoid defeat to Stoke at the Britannia Stadium, as they lost just three of their final 21 league games. In March, Jeff Minton was transferred to Rotherham United, and Ashley Dodd arrived at Vale Park on loan from Manchester United. The next month Richard Burgess also joined the club after leaving Bromsgrove Rovers. A cup run and numerous fixture postponements meant the club were forced to play eight games in April, of which only two ended in defeat; for this achievement Horton was named Manager of the Month. The 1 May draw with Manor Ground was the final match in the stadium's 125-year history. Two days later, the final home game of the season, Billy Paynter made his debut aged only 16 years and 294 days.

They finished in eleventh place with 62 points, some distance from both the play-off and the relegation zones. They finished six places and fifteen points away from Stoke, who went on to lose in the play-offs. Tony Naylor was the club's top-scorer with 21 goals in all competitions, with new players Bridge-Wilkinson and Brooker also hitting double figures.

At the end of the season numerous players left the club: seven-year club legend and top-scorer Tony Naylor (Cheltenham Town); eight-year club veteran Allen Tankard (Mansfield Town); former Player of the Year Tommy Widdrington (Hartlepool United); Alex Smith (Reading); Richard Eyre (Macclesfield Town); Dele Olaoye (Stafford Rangers); and Michael Twiss (Leigh RMI). Dave Brammer was also sold to Crewe Alexandra for £500,000 – a move that highly upset many Vale fans.

Finances
Before the season began director Peter Wright quit the club, though Bell said he had in fact been sacked. Work on the Lorne Street stand ground to a halt, as the club ran out of money to complete the project. Vale were in a financial crisis, and fans protested against Chairman Bill Bell. There were rumours of a merger with Stoke City, as the media reported the possible financial collapse of the club. A rare positive note was a £250,000 five-year sponsorship deal with the Bass Brewery. Local barrister Charles Machin was appointed onto the club board in July 2000, and in November stated that "my 10-year ambition is to see the Vale in the top five clubs in Europe. It is my profound belief the power of God will help get the Vale to the top." Machin handed Brian Horton a 60 section questionnaire on each player on the team every two weeks, and was branded as "belligerent, uncooperative and bizarre" by the League Managers Association. Nevertheless, the director insists that he has the club's backing to sign players from Cameroon and Italy, and publicly berates rival club Stoke City, whilst Bell states that he is in negotiations for a player-exchange deal with Brazilian club Corinthian. In October, Machin tells the press that he would sack Brian Horton if the club had the money to pay for his severance package; meanwhile Marketing Manager Rob Edwards resigns after less than two months into the job. Machin quit the club in November, and two months later set up 'Valiant2001', a fan based consortium looking to buy the club off Bill Bell. Former vice-chairman Mike Thompstone also attempted a takeover of the club, which was resisted by Bell. The Valiant2001 project took off with Machin at the helm, who said he should be the new chairman as "I can't think of anyone I trust more than myself". The project raised £73,000 by June, and Thompstone also pledged his support. Ex-director Stephen Plant also sued the Bell and the club in November, and made a £100,000 settlement in May. Another director, shopkeeper Neil Hughes, resigned in February; he returned to the club the next month, only to resign for a second time in six weeks. Dave Jolley (who had previously resigned at Stockport County after proposing a move to Maine Road) was appointed Chief Executive in February. The club's shirt sponsors were Tunstall Assurance.

Cup competitions
In the FA Cup, Vale suffered humiliation. Leading 2–0 at half-time, they reached full-time with a 4–4 draw at non-league Canvey Island after two last-minute Canvey goals. Back at Vale Park, the game was goalless after normal time, and Canvey scored two extra-time goals to win the match 2–1 after a last second strike from Naylor. Vale responded to the humiliation by putting five players on the transfer list: Liam Burns, Ville Viljanen, Sagi Burton, Jeff Minton and Michael Twiss.

In the League Cup, for the third consecutive season Vale lost in the First Round to a Third Division side, this time Chesterfield. After a 2–1 defeat at Saltergate, Chesterfield held on to a 2–2 draw in Burslem.

In the League Trophy, the Vale eased past Notts County with a 3–0 win. The result ended Vale's sequence of eighteen cup games without a victory. They then faced Chester City of the Conference, who they defeated 2–0. The area quarter-final also proved to be no challenge for Vale, as they triumphed 4–0 over Darlington. The semi-final stage held a real challenge however, with the match against rivals Stoke City held at the Britannia Stadium despite the draw giving Vale a home tie. Cummins put Vale ahead before Nicky Mohan equalized to take the match into extra-time. A 105th minute Bridge-Wilkinson penalty put Vale into the regional final. It was a two-legged affair with Lincoln City, and Vale were the victors with a 2–0 win at Sincil Bank, thanks to goals from Bridge-Wilkinson and Naylor. Brentford awaited in the final at the Millennium Stadium. Vale lifted the trophy for the second time with a 2–1 victory, Bridge-Wilkinson and Steve Brooker scoring the goals on a rainy day in front of 25,654 spectators at the Millennium Stadium; Brooker scored the game's opening goal from the penalty spot after Naylor was fouled by Darren Powell on 77 minutes, and it was also Naylor who provided the assist for Brooker's winner six minutes later.

League table

Results
Port Vale's score comes first

Football League Second Division

Results by matchday

Matches

FA Cup

League Cup

League Trophy

Player statistics

Appearances

Top scorers

Transfers

Transfers in

Transfers out

Loans in

References
Specific

General
Soccerbase

Port Vale F.C. seasons
Port Vale